Italy–Serbia relations are diplomatic relations between Italy and Serbia. Kingdom of Italy established formal bilateral relations with the Principality of Serbia on 18 January 1879. The strategic partnership between the Republic of Serbia and the Republic of Italy was established in Rome on 13 November 2009. Italy is one of the member states of the European Union which strongly support Accession of Serbia to the European Union. Both countries are members of the Central European Initiative, OSCE, Council of Europe and the World Trade Organization.

History

Before the establishment of the formal bilateral relations

Economic, social and political interactions between Italian Peninsula and Balkan Peninsula are of historical longue durée and were intensive ever since the Roman Empire conquered of the region. Grand Prince of Serbia Stefan the First-Crowned (1165–1228) coronation was performed by a legate of Pope Urban II which led some Serbian historians to conclude that Stefan underwent both Catholic and Orthodox coronations, but modern scholars tend to agree that only the papal one took place. Stefan's third wife, Venetian noblewoman Anna Dandolo, became Queen of Serbia and was mother to Stefan Uroš I. Popular legend claims that the Žiča Monastery, seat of the Serbian Orthodox Church between 1219 and 1253, was intentionally constructed on the halfway between Rome and Constantinople.

Principality of Serbia held friendly relations with Kingdom of Sardinia and drew the inspiration and lessons for the Serbian unification from the Italian unification, in which Kingdom of Sardinia played an important part. Italian movement became the main example for United Serb Youth, which took inspiration from Mazzini’s movement. Until the 1860s Serbia and Italy both pursued anti-Austrian politics, which made the two countries closer. Following the Austro-Hungarian Compromise of 1867 Italy supported Serbian leadership as the Piedmont of the South Slavs with Prince Mihailo Obrenović as its leader. During the Congress of Berlin Italy supported Serbia's request for independence but did not support other request made by Serbian leadership.

Relations up until the creation of Kingdom of Yugoslavia
Kingdom of Italy established formal bilateral relations with the Principality of Serbia on 18 January 1879.

When WWI started Italian FM Antonino Paternò Castello, Marchese di San Giuliano pursued a generally cautious policy and Italian greater presence in the region via various investments and construction of railways. The next Minister of Foreign Affairs Sidney Sonnino did not follow up on his policies but rather wanted to expand Italy's territories on the Adriatic (mainly Montenegro, Dalmatia and Albania), which was opposed to the Serbian policy of unification.

Yugoslav period

Breakup of Yugoslavia

In the initial phase of the Breakup of Yugoslavia Members of the European Economic Community were divided over the importance they should give to the potentially contradictory principles of self-determination and territorial integrity. German Chancellor Helmut Kohl strongly stressing the right to self-determination, French President François Mitterrand arguing against immediate cutoff of aid to Yugoslavia, while Spain, Italy and United Kingdom insisted on the territorial integrity of Yugoslavia. In the period following the breakup of Yugoslavia Italy perceived Belgrade as an ally for diplomatic leverage on newly independent Croatia and Slovenia in advocating rights of Istrian Italians and recognition of Istrian-Dalmatian exodus while in addition Italian left showed sympathy towards the country under international sanctions. Staff size at the Italian Embassy in Belgrade barely changed between years 1990 and 2010.

Relations between Italy and the Federal Republic of Yugoslavia (Serbia-Montenegro) under Slobodan Milosevic's rule were cold but nevertheless continued. The Italian government bought shares in Telekom Serbia, but also took part in the 1999 NATO bombing of Yugoslavia when the NATO-member states used the Aviano Air Base in Italy from where military aeroplanes dropped bombs onto Yugoslavia. Italian participation was perceived as a major rapture in relations, yet Rome decided to participate in NATO bombing as it enabled Italy to get a primary role in the aftermath of the war. 1999 NATO bombing of Yugoslavia was the first NATO intervention led by Italian officials and the country was the second largest contributing state of the NATO Kosovo Force. This offered an opportunity for Italy to regain a more central role in Mediterranean diplomacy which particularly materialized in UNIFIL Lebanon. Italy and Serbia quickly normalized relations after the overthrow of Slobodan Milošević and Rome becoming one of the first supporters of Serbia's European integrations.

Serbian university professor and academic Nikša Stipčević made various contributions to the study of Serbian-Italian relations in the 19th century and history of the relations in general.

Relations since 2006
On 21 February 2008 Italy recognized unilateral declaration of independence of Kosovo which in previous days was recognized by France, United Kingdom, United States and Germany as well. This was perceived as a second major blow to the relations after 1999 intervention and Serbia recalled its ambassador for a couple of months but subsequently normalized relations. Former Italian Minister of Foreign Affairs and at the time High Representative of the Union for Foreign Affairs and Security Policy Federica Mogherini facilitated Belgrade–Pristina negotiations. In an effort to reach final comprehensive agreement between two sides Mogherini was open to the idea of Partition of Kosovo but the agreement was not reached due to Kosovo's announcement of a 10% and subsequently 100% tariffs on goods imported from Serbia and Bosnia-Herzegovina. In 2016 Italy was represented in Belgrade with 25 diplomats, just behind Russia (54), United States (40), China (37), Germany (33) and Libya (27) but more than Austria, France, Turkey, Hungary, United Kingdom or Serbian diplomatic allies in Europe such as Greece and Spain.  Comparatively high Italian presence was explained with growing economic ties, unusually high Libyan diplomatic presence, Serbia's role in Western Balkans and Italian leading role in developing the best possible NATO–Serbia relations short of membership.

Italy and Serbia co-hosted the 2005 Men's European Volleyball Championship and 2011 Women's European Volleyball Championship.

Italy is one of Serbia's main trading partners. In 2019, Italy was the fourth largest source of imports and the second largest export destination for Serbia.

On April 25 Serbia sent 8 planes with medical aid to Italy, due to the COVID-19 pandemic. Serbia sent 2 million epidemiological masks, 2 million surgical masks 1 million gloves, 100 thousand suits.

Gallery

Diplomatic missions

Republic of Italy
Belgrade (Embassy)  

Republic of Serbia
Rome (Embassy) 
Milan (Consulate-General) 
Trieste (Consulate-General)

See also 
 Italy–Yugoslavia relations
 Foreign relations of Italy
 Foreign relations of Serbia
 Balkan Romance languages

Sources

External links 
  Italian embassy in Belgrade (in Italian and Serbian only)
  Serbian Ministry of Foreign Affairs about relations with Italy

References 

 

 
Serbia
Bilateral relations of Serbia